Lewis “Lewy” Williams (born 18 January 2002 in Swansea) is a Welsh professional darts player who currently plays in the Professional Darts Corporation events.

Born in Swansea, Williams moved to Liverpool, where he has trained as a barber.

He qualified for the 2020 UK Open via the Riley's Qualifiers, and defeated Robert Owen, Adrian Gray and José de Sousa, before losing in a last leg decider in the last 64 to Steve West.

Williams secured a two-year PDC Tour Card at UK Qualifying School in February 2021, sealing his professional status with a day to spare.

Williams made his television debut on 14 October 2021 in the 2021 European Championship, losing in the first round to José de Sousa 6–4.

World Championship results

PDC
 2022: Second round (lost to Gabriel Clemens 0–3)
 2023: Second round (lost to Michael van Gerwen 0–3)

Personal life
Lewy attended Cwmtawe Community School.

Performance timeline

PDC

PDC European Tour

References

External links

2002 births
Living people
Professional Darts Corporation current tour card holders
Welsh darts players
Sportspeople from Swansea